Reba Buhr (born November 7, 1987) is an American voice actress who has worked on English dubbed anime series, Western animated TV series, and video games. She hosted the news segment Disney 365 on the Disney Channel from 2011–2012. Some of her roles include Misty in Pokémon Masters, Rose and Juleka in Miraculous: Tales of Ladybug and Cat Noir, Yukie Kanoko in Godzilla Singular Point, and Kohiruimaki Karen/LLENN in Sword Art Online: Alternative Gun Gale Online. Buhr is also a singer, having studied Theater and Voice at Occidental College, and has performed live at Disney's California Adventure as Jasmine in Aladdin! A Musical Spectacular, among other shows.

Filmography

Anime

TV, film, and webseries

Video games

Theatre and live shows

Audiobooks

References

External links 
 Official Website
 Reba Buhr on Twitter
 
 Reba Buhr on Behind the Voice Actors
 Audiobooks narrated by Reba Buhr on Audible
 Reba Buhr on BroadwayWorld

1987 births
Living people
21st-century American women singers
21st-century American singers
American video game actresses
American voice actresses
21st-century American actresses
People from Maple Valley, Washington